Minot Carnegie Library on 2nd Ave., SE, in Downtown Minot, North Dakota.

It was built in 1911 and was designed by Minot architects Woodruff & McGulpin in Classical Revival style.  It has also been known as Free Public Library, Carnegie Library and Minot Public Library.  It was listed on the National Register of Historic Places in 1980. It served as the public library for Minot from 1912 until 1965, until the new Minot Public Library building was built.

It was used as a library until 1965, then used as a senior center, then was vacant from 1979 until the time of NRHP listing.

References

Library buildings completed in 1911
Neoclassical architecture in North Dakota
Libraries on the National Register of Historic Places in North Dakota
Buildings and structures in Minot, North Dakota
1911 establishments in North Dakota
National Register of Historic Places in Ward County, North Dakota
Carnegie libraries in North Dakota